Hasleby is a surname. Notable people with the surname include:

 James Hasleby (1833–1903), convict and settler
 Paul Hasleby (born 1981), Australian rules footballer

See also
 Hasley
 Hässelby, town in Sweden